Founded 2005 the Green Electronics Council (GEC) is a mission-driven non-profit that promotes green computing and works towards  the adoption of environmentally friendly practices.

EPEAT 

GEC operates the Electronic Product Environmental Assessment Tool (EPEAT) system, which assists in the purchase of "greener" PCs and displays, imaging equipment and televisions. The EPEAT system evaluates electronics on more than 50 environmental criteria, some required and some optional, that measure a product's efficiency and sustainability attributes. Products are rated Gold, Silver or Bronze depending on how many optional criteria they meet. On 2007-01-24, President George W. Bush issued Executive Order 13423, which requires all United States Federal agencies to use EPEAT when purchasing computer systems. President Barack Obama issued a similar Executive Order in 2009. In 2012 EPEAT was launched in India. By 2015, the number of registered green devices had risen by 108%.

In partnership with the Yale Center for Green Chemistry and Engineering, in Sept. of 2008 GEC held a Forum for Sustainable Information and Communication Technologies (ICT) at Yale.

Catalyst Award 

 Green Electronics Council hosts and presents the annual Catalyst Award for "practical projects whose impact can inspire further innovation in the electronics space." In the 2015 Dell received an award for their innovations in environmental safety of electronic production. During the 2014 calendar year Dell used 5000 tons of recycled plastic in its production of 34 products. Other notable nominees included Hewlett-Packard, Toshiba, and Arrow Electronics.

Emerging Green Conference 
Emerging Green Conference is an annual event organized by Green Electronics Council, where technology leaders meet to discuss "advances, challenges and future of sustainable electronics." The latest gathering happened in September 2015 where over 30 companies and organizations attended a two-day event at The Nines Hotel in Portland, Oregon.

Board of Directors 

Mark Buckley - Founder, One Boat Collaborative

Jean Cox-Kearns, M.SC - Managing Director, Sustainability Care Ltd.

Richard Crespin - Treasurer, Chief Executive Officer, Collaborate Up

Victor Duart - Former Manager Environmental Policy and Programs IBM EMEA, ASEAN, Japan

Daniel Kreeger - Co Founder & Executive Director, Association of Climate Change Officers

JaNay Queen Nazaire, PhD - Chief Strategy Officer, Living Cities

Jeanne Ng, PhD - Chairman, Hong Kong Institute of Qualified Environmental Professionals

Carl Smith - Chair, President Emeritus, Call2recycle

Trisa Thompson - Vice Chair, Former Senior Vice President and Chief Responsibility Officer, Dell

Kathrin Winkler - Secretary, Former Chief Sustainability, EMC Corporation

See also
Green chemistry
One Laptop per Child

References

External links

Publications
Closing the Loop Electronics Design to Enhance Reuse/Recycling Value, research on what information electronics recyclers need from OEMs in order to make recycling more economically and environmentally effective and how that information might be managed, 2009
The Connection Between Electronics and Sustainability

Environmental design
Electronics and the environment